Haplotrema vancouverense, common name the robust lancetooth, is a species of predatory air-breathing land snail, a terrestrial pulmonate gastropod mollusk in the family Haplotrematidae.

References

Haplotrematidae
Gastropods described in 1839